Kobaladze (in Georgian კობალაძე) is a Georgian surname. Notable people with the surname include:

George Kobaladze (born 1976), Georgian-Canadian weightlifter
Koba Kobaladze (born 1969), major-general of the Georgian army

Georgian-language surnames